Milldown is a hill in the Rhinns of Kells, a sub-range of the Galloway Hills range, part of the Southern Uplands of Scotland. It is located immediately north of Meikle Millyea - between these two hills lie the Lochans of Auchniebut, a series of small water bodies at an approximate elevation of 650m - possibly the highest permanent water bodies in the Southern Uplands. As well as this, the hill is also flanked on its SW side by forest plantation - possibly the highest planted commercial forestry in the Southern Uplands. Like most of its neighbours, it is most easily climbed from the east at Forrest Lodge.

Subsidiary SMC Summits

References

Mountains and hills of the Southern Uplands
Mountains and hills of Dumfries and Galloway
Donald mountains